Pagleaazam is a 2020 Indian Hindi-language comedy film directed by Vikas P Kavthekar and APS Raghuvanshi starring Aditya Pratap Singh and Sonia Sharma. It was produced by Aditya Pratap Singh, Ram Agnihotri and Prakhyata Singh. The film was theatrically released in India on 31 January 2020.

Cast
 Aditya Pratap Singh
 Sonia Sharma
 Mannat procha
 Liliput
 Ravi Mann 
 Abhinay Sharma
 Sahil Patel
 Amber Upadhyay
 Rahul Varun

References

External links
 
 

2020 films
Indian comedy films
2020s Hindi-language films
2020 comedy films
Hindi-language comedy films